Something's Gotta Give or Something's Got to Give may refer to:

Film
 Something's Got to Give, a 1962 film starring Marilyn Monroe and Dean Martin
 Something's Gotta Give (film), a 2003 film starring Jack Nicholson and Diane Keaton

Music

Albums
 Something's Gotta Give (album), by Agnostic Front, 1998
 Something Gotta Give, a mixtape by Big Lean, 2011

Songs
 "Something's Gotta Give" (The John Butler Trio song), 2004
 "Something's Gotta Give" (Johnny Mercer song), first performed by Fred Astaire in the film Daddy Long Legs, 1955; covered by many
 "Something's Gotta Give" (LeAnn Rimes song), 2005
 "Something's Gotta Give", by Aerosmith from Nine Lives, 1997
 "Something's Gotta Give", by All Time Low from Future Hearts, 2015
 "Something's Got to Give", by the Beastie Boys from Check Your Head, 1992
 "Somethin's Gotta Give", by Billy Sheehan from Compression, 2001
 "Something's Gotta Give", by Camila Cabello from Camila, 2018
 "Something's Gotta Give", by Pere Ubu from The Tenement Year, 1988

Other
 "Something's Gotta Give" (Grey's Anatomy), a television episode
 "Something's Got to Give", a New York Times Magazine article by Darcy Frey, basis for the film Pushing Tin

de:Was das Herz begehrt